"The Buszy", built in 2005, is a skatepark plaza in Milton Keynes, England. The skate area is covered almost entirely by the roof of the former Milton Keynes Central bus station.

Pronounced "Buzzy" by the locals, the bus station, including the plaza that sits underneath its roof, is grade two listed.

Location

The full UK postal address of the Buszy is: 401 Elder Gate, Milton Keynes, MK9 1LR.

History

The early years
The Buszy has always been a focal point of the skateboard scene in Milton Keynes, even before it became a designated area to skateboard. Long before the area was designated a skateboard plaza, Chris Ince and his family owned and ran the One Stop Café inside the bus station. They sold skateboard products to the local skaters who skated the marble ledges and open flat ground areas around the station. The first skateboard competition was held at the Buszy in 1992, attended by between four and five hundred people. The Ince family, Chris, Jennifer, Steven and Damian built Radlands indoor skatepark that same year.

The SK8MK Project

Local skateboarder and cinematographer Lindsay Knight was instrumental in helping the local council understand the needs of the local skateboarders, making a video to help the Chamber of Commerce understand street skateboarding. He countered the actions of the local police, who had supported the criminalisation of skateboarding in Milton Keynes.

The Elder Gate Crew
The Buszy is historically the home of the Elder Gate Crew (EGC), a group of locals who skated at the spot together regularly. With the stewardship and cinematography skills of member Carter Hewlett, they released two skate videos documenting skateboarding at the Buszy during the late 2000s, named "The Elder Gate Crew Video" and "Get to Know".

MK Skate
In May 2019, MK Skate, a project exploring the history of skateboarding in Milton Keynes, was founded, going on to secure £97,800 in National Lottery Heritage Funding. To celebrate Milton Keyne's contribution to skateboarding, MK Skate delivered a city centre trail, an exhibition shown between 27 September to 22 December 2019, and a book. A permanent record of Skateboarding in Milton Keynes has been stored in the city's archive and the Milton Keynes Museum.

Park Layout

Obstacles
The Buszy has the following obstacles inside of the designated skate area:

 A large marble and granite T-block
 A low curved block
 A 5 stair stairway
 A large metal edged manual pad
 A long flat medium height marble block
 A short to medium in length, medium height marble block
 A short very high to low manual pad
 A small stair set
 A fairly long metal edged, downwards sloping, successive chain of smoothly connected blocks also known as a "roller coaster"
 A medium height, very long marble hubba style ledge down 5 stairs
 A flat low, medium length metal bar
 A medium height, very long metal edged hubba style ledge down 5 stairs

Because the area is a street skateboarding plaza, the majority of the flooring is covered using the same large square floor tiles found in the rest of Central Milton Keynes. This is instead of a power-flowed concrete constructed floor found in traditional skateparks. Skateboarders new to the spot will notice the melodic rumble of the tiles as their wheels roll over them.

Competitions and demos
Since 1992, there have been many small events held at the Buszy by skateboarders in collaboration with local businesses and charities with both national and international professionals in attendance.

Notable events
There have been many jams, demos and competitions at the Buszy. The plaza has held demos and received visits from renowned professional skateboarding teams such as  Girl Skateboards, Flip, Zoo York, DC, Element, Blueprint and Matix Clothing.

Battle of The Buszy
On 2 June 2007, Plan B Skateboards sent a team of Skateboarders to the Buszy to take part in a special one-off event called "The Battle of The Buszy". The group included professional skateboarder Paul Rodriguez.

Go Skateboarding Day
Each year on the 21st of June, there is a regular meeting of locals at the Buszy on Go Skateboarding Day. The event is loosely organised, and there is occasionally a competition that may include a game of S.K.A.T.E..

Easy access to the Buszy by train makes Go Skateboarding Day popular for Skateboarders from around the rest of the United Kingdom to travel to the plaza and skate.

Hip Hop
The plaza contains a large collection of vivid and creative art works as the result of many highly respected national and local graffiti artists working at the Buszy, who painted the large, free, legal wall that is situated at the near side of the designated skate area.

All of the four basic elements of hip hop: breakdancing, graffiti, MC-ing, and DJing, have local history rooted to the spot. For example, members of the band Hacktivist would come to the skate jams to perform before the group was formed, gaining worldwide fame. Dance crew  would regularly be seen practising in front of the reflective windows of the bus station.

Charity

Make a Difference (MaD)
In 2005, the Community interest company Make a Difference (abbreviated to MaD), was given control of the Buszy to turn the disused building into a multi-service youth hub.

With a £500,000 investment from the SITA Trust and V, the national youth volunteering service, MaD spent the following ten years redeveloping the former bus station and delivered community youth services to the area.

MaD was also instrumental in the majority of the skate jams and competitions that occurred between 2005 and 2015. Events were routinely overseen by Liam Snusher.

On 19 January 2016, MaD's Buszy Twitter account announced the closure of the youth hub. The building owners, Milton Keynes Development Partnership, an agency of Milton Keynes Council, decided not to permit MaD further use of the building, stating that it did not have direct control of the Milton Keynes Development Partnership. The council now operates the carpark.

The Winter Night Shelter
Since MaD moved out of the building, The Winter Night Shelter has used the Buszy to provide shelter and assistance to the homeless population of Milton Keynes, which has grown significantly since sweeping local and national government cutbacks came into force.

Business
The owners of the building (Milton Keynes Development Partnership) currently let the old bus station's building to the following business tenants:

Romeo Dance Academy
New Money Recordings

Romeo Dance Academy obtained a ten-year lease in May 2018.

References

External links
MK Skate – The Story of Skateboarding in Milton Keynes – Exhibition website
How Milton Keynes became UK's 'skate capital' – BBC article
MK Skate – MK Skate Exhibition – Community exhibition

Parks and open spaces in the Borough of Milton Keynes
Skateparks in the United Kingdom